The Vital Dent Foundation is non-profit making organisation whose mission is to help spreading dental health habits and prevention.
The Foundation is present in those countries where Vital Dent operates, such as Spain, Portugal and Italy.

Main areas of activity are:
Research
Welfare projects
Popularization programs
Dentistry Sciences Institute

Research
The Vital Dent Foundation sponsors dentistry research via the awarding of annual prizes which range from 10 to €40,000. Although originally prizes were awarded only in Spain, since the 5th Edition the scope of countries has been extended to Italy, Portugal and United States.

In the last edition (6th edition), prizes have been split in 3 categories:
Basic Research (€40,000)
Medical Research (€35,000)
Bibliographical systematic review (€10,000)

Welfare projects
With the collaboration of non-profit organizations, the Vital Dent Foundation and its team of volunteers focus on two lines of activity: the Smile Route and the Permanent Solidarity Centre.

The Smile Route
Together with the NGO Solidariamente, the Vital Dent Foundation offers its experience in the dental field to people who happen not to be born in a country of the wrongly called First World. Three editions have already taken place, and they have managed to perform more than 24,000 interventions, including mouth cleanings, piece extractions, filling and sealing. These editions have developed in Morocco, although the plan is to extend the reach to other equally needed countries.

Permanent Solidarity Centre
The main objective is to create this centre in Morocco to insure that actions taken through the Smile Route initiative are not isolated and can be continuously developed on a daily basis with the help of Vital Dent dentist under local coordination.

Disclosure
One of the Foundation’s main objectives is to inform the young about the importance of dental care in their life’s health. Messages are passed with the help of a pet, the "Perez Mouse", who visits plenty of schools in Spain to make dental healthcare amusing for children.

Institute of Dentistry Specialties
The Institute’s objective is to provide continuous training to dentists to make available the newest and most advanced methodologies and techniques being used in the oral health field. The Institute runs five departments:
Integrated
Surgery, periodontics and dental implants
Prosthodontics
Orthodontics
Endodontics

External links
The Vital Dent Foundation official page
The Smile Route official page

International organisations based in Spain
Dental organizations
Medical and health organisations based in Spain